An alleged member of the Provisional Irish Republican Army, William James Carson was killed in 1979 by Billy Dodds and John Mullan leaving behind a devastated wife, Anna.

Murder
On 24 April 1979, a Loyalist Ulster Defence Association death squad consisting of William John Mullan and Billy Dodds visited Carson's home on Rosevale Street in Belfast with the intention to kill him. They were told by his young son and daughter that their parents were not home, and left. They returned an hour later, and since the 32-year-old Carson was still not home, the men sat with his 11-year-old daughter watching television, until he returned, at which point they shot him in front of his child. He died in hospital in the early morning hours.

Aftermath
Mullan served 14 years for the murder, and was re-arrested while planning a robbery at First Trust Bank in 2004. Charges were dropped in the bank robbery, but he was deemed to have broken parole conditions in the action, and returned to prison.

References

Provisional Irish Republican Army members
1979 deaths
Year of birth missing